The expression "fig leaf" is widely used figuratively to convey the covering up of an act or an object that is embarrassing or distasteful with something of innocuous appearance, a metaphorical reference to the Biblical Book of Genesis in which Adam and Eve used fig leaves to cover their nudity after eating the forbidden fruit from the tree of the knowledge of good and evil. Some paintings and statues have the genitals of their subjects covered by a representation of an actual fig leaf or similar object, either as part of the work or added afterward for perceived modesty.

History

In Ancient Greek art, male nakedness, including the genitals, was common, although the female vulval area  was generally covered in art for public display.  This tradition continued in Ancient Roman art until the conversion of the Roman Empire to Christianity, when heroic nudity vanished.  During the Middle Ages, only the unfortunate (most often the damned) were usually shown naked, although the depictions were then often rather explicit. Adam and Eve were often shown wearing fig or other leaves, following the Biblical description.  This was especially a feature of Northern Renaissance art.

From about 1530, the developing reaction to Renaissance freedoms and excesses that led to the Council of Trent also led to a number of artworks, especially in churches or public places, being altered to reduce the amount of nudity on display.  Often, as in the famous case of Michelangelo's The Last Judgement, drapery or extra branches from any nearby bush was used. This has been dubbed the "fig leaf campaign". For free-standing statues this did not work well, and carved or cast fig leaves were sometimes added, such as with the plaster copy of Michelangelo's David displayed in Victorian era London. Historian Daniel J. Boorstin said that:
The age of the rising middle class in Victorian England was, or course, the age of the fig leaf. "The fig leaves of decent reticence" which Charles Kingsley described were applied not only to statuary but to literature as well. The Adam and Eve panels on the Ghent Altarpiece, already equipped with fig leaves by Jan van Eyck,  were simply replaced with 19th-century panels copying the figures but clothed.   Many of these alterations have since been reversed, damaging some of the statues.

Modern day

Eugen Sandow, often considered the first modern-day bodybuilder, was an admirer of the human physique. In addition to strongman sideshows, he performed "muscle displays" by posing in the nude—save for a fig leaf that he would don in imitation of statues he had seen in Italy as a boy.

Metaphorical use

The expression fig leaf has a pejorative metaphorical sense meaning a flimsy or minimal cover for anything or behaviour that might be considered shameful, with the implication that the cover is only a token gesture and the truth is obvious to all who choose to see it.

A metaphorical fig leaf is something visible but innocuous, as against a coverup in which the existence of something may be entirely hidden.

In the context of negotiation, an offer might be characterized as a "fig leaf" if that offer is actually a ploy to conceal a sinister plan.

See also
 Censorship
 Christian naturism
 Expurgation, also known as a "fig-leaf edition"
 Olive branch

Citations

General bibliography

External links 
 Museum Secrets: Fig leaf campaign
 Alberti's Window
 A Timeline of Early Modern Censorship
 The Prude Nude: Censorship and Cover-Ups in Art
 BBC: Fig Leaf: The Biggest Cover Up in History

English phrases
Book of Genesis
Iconography
Biblical phrases
Self-censorship
Adam and Eve
Censorship